Mt. Angel Pioneer Cemetery is an historic cemetery in Mt. Angel, Oregon, United States.

External links
 
 
 
 Mt. Angel Pioneer Cemetery – Mt. Angel, Oregon at Waymarking

Cemeteries in Oregon
Mt. Angel, Oregon